Richard Rangi Wallace  is a New Zealand Māori Anglican bishop. He was nominated at the Electoral College of 23–25 September 2016 to be the second Pīhopa o (Bishop of) Te Pīhopatanga o Te Waipounamu. He was duly consecrated on 21 January 2017 and installed that month.

In the 2009 New Year Honours, Wallace was awarded the Queen's Service Medal, for services to Māori.

References

Living people
Ngāi Tahu people
New Zealand Māori religious leaders
21st-century Anglican bishops in New Zealand
Recipients of the Queen's Service Medal
Year of birth missing (living people)
Anglican bishops of Te Waipounamu